Industrial Independent School District is a public school district based in the community of Vanderbilt, Texas, United States.

The district currently serves an area of three hundred square miles in southern Jackson County and a portion of Victoria County. It encompasses the communities of Vanderbilt, Lolita, Inez, Francitas, La Salle, and La Ward.

In 2009, the school district was rated "academically acceptable" by the Texas Education Agency.

History
In the summer of 1948, the Industrial Consolidated Independent School District was organized. It was formed through the merger of three districts -  Vanderbilt, La Ward, and Lolita. Two more districts, Francitas and Inez, joined the district in December 1948.  In September 1949, the new district held its first classes. In March 1961, the district dropped the word 'Consolidated' from its name and became known as the Industrial Independent School District.

Schools
Industrial High School (Grades 9-12)
Industrial Junior High School (Grades 6-8)
Industrial Elementary School East (Grades PK-5)
Industrial Elementary School West (Grades PK-5)

References

External links
 

School districts in Jackson County, Texas
School districts in Victoria County, Texas
School districts established in 1948